Hendrick Lubbers (December 30, 1926 – March 18, 1993) was an American field hockey player. He competed in the men's tournament at the 1948 Summer Olympics.

References

External links
 

1926 births
1993 deaths
American male field hockey players
Olympic field hockey players of the United States
Field hockey players at the 1948 Summer Olympics
People from Bronxville, New York